Tom Smith is an American college baseball coach, formerly the head coach of the UNC Asheville Bulldogs baseball team.  He retired from that position following the 2014 season after holding it for five years.

Smith played at Western Carolina, where he earned a pair of varsity letters.  After completing his degree at Western in 1978, he became head coach at T. C. Roberson High School, where he led the Rams to three state championships, fourteen conference titles, and saw 20 players drafted in the Major League Baseball Draft. Roberson established itself as one of the top programs in the state during his 28 years as head coach, and Smith collected a record of 478–185. He retired after the 2006 season in order to watch his son, Kenny, play his final collegiate season at Western Carolina, after transferring from UNC Wilmington.  A year later, Smith became an assistant at UNC Asheville, and two years after that he was elevated to head coach.  Kenny is now an assistant at High Point.

Head coaching record

References

External links
Tom Smith Retires as UNC Asheville Head Baseball Coach, May 19, 2014

Living people
High school baseball coaches in the United States
UNC Asheville Bulldogs baseball coaches
Western Carolina Catamounts baseball players
Year of birth missing (living people)